Johann Wolfgang Baumgartner (1702 in Ebbs, Tirol - 7 September 1761 in Augsburg) was an Austrian-German Rococo painter.

Life
He was born Johann Wolfgang Baumgartner in Tyrol and he learned glass painting in Salzburg. He moved to Augsburg and worked as a glass painter. The ceiling painting in the Sanctuary of the Holy Cross of the former Klosters Mountains is considered as his largest and most important work.

Works
Ceiling frescoes of the Sanctuary of St. Mary of Mount Carmel in Baitenhausen in Meersburg on Lake Constance, 1760
 Ceiling frescoes in the nave of the Sanctuary of St. Maria Loreto in Westheim
  The Martyrdom of St. Venantius of Camerino 
  Daily edification of a true Christian 
  Mark the Evangelist writing 
  The Holy. John I. and the Gothic King Theodoric 
 Drawings of Bible pictures in  Historia veteris (ac novi) Testamenti Iconibus Expressa

References

Further reading
 Bruno Bushart, Friedrich Kaess:  monastery Bergen Neuburg an der Donau and its frescoes by Johann Wolfgang Baumgartner . 1981
 Peter Stoll and Heide-Maria Krauthauf: "Johann Wolfgang Baumgartner and the 'Holy Albert of Trapani' in the former Carmelite Schongauer". In:  The Welf: Yearbook of the Historical Society Schongau - town and country  10 (2008/09), S. 177-194.
 Peter Stoll:  Anton Winter Gerst copied Johann Wolfgang Baumgartner ''. University Library, Augsburg 2013 (full text)

External links

Johann Wolfgang Baumgartner

1702 births
1761 deaths
18th-century German painters
18th-century German male artists
German male painters